The 2009 Champions League Twenty20 was the first edition of the Champions League Twenty20, an international club cricket tournament. It was held in India between 8 October and 23 October 2009 and featured 12 domestic teams from Australia, England, India, New Zealand, South Africa, Sri Lanka and the West Indies. The New South Wales Blues were the winners of the tournament, defeating Trinidad and Tobago in the final.

Format 
The tournament consisted of the 12 domestic teams from seven countries as determined by the domestic Twenty20 tournaments of those countries. The tournament has 23 matches, and is divided into three stages: the group, league and knockout stages. If a match ends in a tie, a Super Over will be played to determine the winner.

The group stage has the teams divided into four equal groups, with each playing a round-robin tournament. The top two teams of each group advances to the league stage. The league stage merges the remaining teams from Groups A and B to form League A, and the remaining teams from Groups C and D to form League B. Another round-robin tournament is played in each league. Teams that have faced each other from the group stage will not play each other again, but have the result from their first meeting carried forward. The top two teams from each league advance to the knockout stage. The knockout stage consists of two semi-finals, with the top team of one league facing the second-placed team from the other. The winners of the semi-finals play the final to determine the winners of the competition.

Points awarded in group and league stages:

Prize money 
The total prize money for the competition was US$6 million. In addition to the prize money, each team receives a participation fee of $500,000. The prize money was distributed as follows:

 $100,000 – Each of the four teams eliminated in the group stage
 $200,000 – Each of the four teams eliminated in the league stage
 $500,000 – Each semi-finalist
 $1.3 million – Runners-up
 $2.5 million – Winners

Qualification 
This tournament featured 12 teams, an increase from the eight teams for the planned 2008 tournament, with the added participation of teams from Sri Lanka, New Zealand and the West Indies. Pakistan's participation was removed due to the decline between Pakistan and India's cricket boards arising from the 2008 Mumbai attacks, which caused the 2008 tournament to be cancelled. Lalit Modi, the chairman of the tournament, claimed the Pakistan government was unwilling to give Pakistan players clearance to travel to India. Representatives of the Pakistan Cricket Board claimed they were not contacted on the matter.

Teams 

There are players who are a part of more than one qualified team. In that case, a player can play for his "home" team (the team from the country he is eligible to represent in international cricket) without consequence. If he plays for any other team, that team must pay the home team US$200,000 as compensation. Only Dirk Nannes was named in more than one preliminary squad – that of the Delhi Daredevils and his "home" team the Victorian Bushrangers. Delhi paid Victoria US$200,000 to retain Nannes.

  The Delhi Daredevils were the best performing semi-finalist in the group stage of the 2009 Indian Premier League.

Venues

Reception 
The tournament was low in popularity due to the lack of team recognition outside the three teams from the host nation India. Matches not involving these teams drew low television ratings and attendances. The Indian teams also had poor performances.

Fixtures 
All times shown are in Indian Standard Time (UTC+05:30).

Group stage

Group A

Group B

Group C

Group D

League stage

League A

League B

Knockout stage

Semi-finals

Final

Final standings

Statistics

Most runs

Most wickets

References

External links 
 Tournament site on ESPN CricInfo

Champions League Twenty20
Champions League Twenty20